The 1981–82 NBA season was Indiana's sixth season in the NBA and 15th season as a franchise.

Offseason

Draft picks

Roster

{| class="toccolours" style="font-size: 95%;"
|-
! colspan="2" style="background-color: #092c57; color: #ffc322; text-align: center;" | 1981-82 Indiana Pacers roster
|- style="background-color: #ffc322; color: #092c57; text-align: center;"
! Players !! Coaches
|-
| valign="top" |
{| class="sortable" style="background:transparent; margin:0px; width:100%;"
! Pos. !! # !! Nat. !! Name !! Ht. !! Wt. !! From
|-

Regular season

Season standings

z - clinched division title
y - clinched division title
x - clinched playoff spot

Record vs. opponents

Game log

Player statistics

Season

Player Statistics Citation:

Awards and records

Transactions

References

See also
 1981-82 NBA season

Indiana Pacers seasons
In
Indiana
Indiana